Remixed: The Definitive Collection is a 2010 compilation of remixes from Delerium's past single releases. Two new songs are included:
"Dust in Gravity" (original and a remix) and a remixed new song "Send Me An Angel".

The album is mixed by Niels van Gogh.

Track listing

 "Dust In Gravity (Niels van Gogh Vs. Dave Ramone Remix)" featuring Kreesha Turner - 6:12
 "Silence (Niels Van Gogh Vs. Thomas Gold Remix)" featuring Sarah McLachlan - 6:20
 "Lost and Found (DJ Dan Club Mix)" featuring Jaël - 5:28
 "Euphoria (Firefly) (Rabbit in the Moon's Divine Gothic Disco Mix)" featuring Jacqui Hunt – 7:15
 "Send Me An Angel (Andy Moor Remix)" featuring Miranda Lee Richards - 7:09
 "Innocente (Falling in Love) (Deep Dish Gladiator Remix UK Edit)" featuring Leigh Nash – 8:04
 "Angelicus (Andy Moor Full Length Mix)" featuring Isabel Bayrakdarian - 7:03
 "After All (Svenson & Gielen Remix)" featuring Jaël - 5:25
 "Underwater (Above & Beyond's 21st Century Mix)" featuring Rani – 6:55
 "Heaven's Earth (Matt Darey Remix Radio Edit)" featuring Kristy Thirsk – 3:27
 "Silence (DJ Tiesto's In Search of Sunrise Remix)" featuring Sarah McLachlan – 7:26
 "Dust In Gravity (Album Version) featuring Kreesha Turner - 3:59

References

Delerium albums
2010 remix albums
Nettwerk Records remix albums